Atsuto (written: 敦斗 or 篤人) is a masculine Japanese given name. Notable people with the name include:

Atsuto Iida (born 1993), Japanese water polo player
, Japanese footballer
, Japanese footballer
, Japanese footballer
, Japanese particle physicist

Japanese masculine given names